Plymouth is a city in Marshall County, Indiana, United States. The population is 10,214 in the 2020 census. It is the county seat of Marshall County. Plymouth was the site of the first retail outlet of defunct U.S. retailer Montgomery Ward in 1926.

Geography
Plymouth, Indiana is located at  (41.343894, -86.312544), along the Yellow River.

Demographics

2010 census
As of the census of 2010, there were 10,033 people, 3,940 households, and 2,401 families residing in the city. The racial makeup of the city was 87.2% White, 0.9% African American, 0.6% Native American, 0.5% Asian, 8.3% from other races, and 2.5% from two or more races. Hispanic or Latino of any race were 20.0% of the population.

There were 3,940 households, of which 34.6% had children under the age of 18 living with them, 39.7% were married couples living together, 14.9% had a female householder with no husband present, 6.3% had a male householder with no wife present, and 39.1% were non-families. 33.5% of all households were made up of individuals, and 15% had someone living alone who was 65 years of age or older. The average household size was 2.49 and the average family size was 3.19.

The median age in the city was 34.3 years. 27.9% of residents were under the age of 18; 9.3% were between the ages of 18 and 24; 25.9% were from 25 to 44; 21.9% were from 45 to 64; and 15.2% were 65 years of age or older. The gender makeup of the city was 47.9% male and 52.1% female.

2000 census
As of the census of 2000, there were 9,840 people, 3,838 households, and 2,406 families residing in the city. The racial makeup of the city was 80.80% White, 0.63% African American, 0.45% Native American, 0.50% Asian, 6.19% from other races, and 1.43% from two or more races. Hispanic or Latino of any race were 14.99% of the population.

There were 3,838 households, out of which 31.9% had children under the age of 18 living with them, 45.3% were married couples living together, 12.2% had a female householder with no husband present, and 37.3% were non-families. 31.4% of all households were made up of individuals, and 14.4% had someone living alone who was 65 years of age or older. The average household size was 2.48 and the average family size was 3.11.

In the city, the population was spread out, with 26.1% under the age of 18, 12.4% from 18 to 24, 28.8% from 25 to 44, 18.0% from 45 to 64, and 14.8% who were 65 years of age or older. The median age was 32 years. For every 100 females, there were 93.5 males. For every 100 females age 18 and over, there were 89.5 males.

The median income for a household in the city was $34,505, and the median income for a family was $41,447. Males had a median income of $30,444 versus $21,293 for females. The per capita income for the city was $15,417. About 10.4% of families and 13.1% of the population were below the poverty line, including 15.9% of those under age 18 and 9.6% of those age 65 or over.

History

Early history
This area was part of the territory of the Potawatomi Native Americans, one of the historical tribes encountered by European-American settlers. In the nineteenth century, the United States government made numerous treaties to buy and extinguish Native American claims to land in the former Northwest Territory and the Southeast.

First settlements
Marshall County was formed in 1836, during the early years of settlement and before the  forced removal of the Potawatomi people in 1838. It was named for U.S. Chief Justice John Marshall, who died in 1835. The first settlers arrived in what is now Marshall County in 1835. They arrived as a result of the end of the Black Hawk War as well as the completion of the Erie Canal. They consisted primarily of settlers from New England, "Yankees" descended from the English Puritans who settled New England in the colonial era. They were mainly members of the Congregational church, although due to the Second Great Awakening many of them had converted to Methodism and some had become Baptists before coming to what is now Marshall County. As a result of this heritage, some place names in Marshall County are named after places in New England, such as Plymouth, which is named after Plymouth, Massachusetts, the site where the Mayflower landed in 1620. When these settlers arrived, there was nothing but a dense virgin forest and wild marshland, which would need to be cleared and drained before it could be farmed. The Indian Removal Act of 1830 authorized forcible removal if necessary. The United States government purchased this area under the Treaty of Tippecanoe in 1832. Plymouth was incorporated as a town in 1851.

Potawatomi Relocation
Although many Potawatomi had relocated to Indian Territory in present-day Kansas, Chief Menominee and his band of the Yellow River refused to go. Militia under the authority of United States Army officers rounded them up and in September 1838, the band of 859 headed west, in what became known as the Potawatomi Trail of Death. They traveled more than 660 miles to Osawatomie, Kansas, with many of the Potawatomi walking. More than 40 of the tribal members died on the march.

American Civil War
During the Civil War, Union Army soldiers arrested Daniel E. VanValkenburgh, editor of the Plymouth Weekly Democrat, who criticized what he viewed as Lincoln's abuses of power. VanValkenburgh also criticized Department of Ohio commander Ambrose Burnside's lieutenant, General Milo S. Hascall. Hascall was in charge of the District of Indiana. VanValkenburgh called Hascall a donkey in the pages of the Democrat. Hascall promptly dispatched soldiers to arrest VanValkenburgh and brought him before Burnside to answer charges of violating Burnside's General Order No. 38. Burnside let VanValkenburgh off with a warning. The Democrat became the first of eleven Democratic newspapers suppressed or threatened with suppression in May 1863.

History as a Sundown Town
Like many towns and counties in Indiana following the Reconstruction Era, Plymouth was once considered a Sundown town. There are many accounts by locals claiming the existence of signs at the northern city limits stating, "Blacks out of town by sundown" or "All non-residents are required to leave the city by 9 pm", with a city ordinance listed at the bottom. There were no such signs at the southern border of town on US 31, nor on the east and west entrances on US 30. North of Plymouth, on US 31, is the city of South Bend, which has a large African-American population. These signs remained posted well into the mid 60s until the Fair Housing Act of 1968 which banned racial discrimination in the sale, rental, and financing of housing. Although the city has since become more inclusive, the African-American population still remains remarkably low at 0.6%. As of today, there has been no public acknowledgment by the city of its history of exclusion.

Later History
On July 6, 1915 the Liberty Bell stopped in Plymouth on its trip from Philadelphia to the Exposition at San Francisco.

Much of Plymouth's history was documented in two major newspapers during the 19th century. The Marshall County Republican (also titled Plymouth Republican and Plymouth Tribune) operated from 1856 to 1922. Its main rival the Marshall County Democrat (also titled Plymouth Democrat) appeared from 1855 to 1932 (and as a weekly only edition until January 1, 1941). During the 20th century, the Plymouth Daily Pilot acquired the Republican in 1922, and the Democrat became the Plymouth Daily News in 1932. The News and Pilot merged to become the Plymouth Pilot-News in 1947.

As part of Plymouth's sesquicentennial celebration in 1966, organizers created the first Marshall County Blueberry Festival, to take place over Labor Day weekend. This tradition has continued annually, and the Festival typically brings in tens of thousands of visitors over the four-day event.

In July 1982, five firefighters were killed when their fire truck overturned while responding to a call. The tanker truck crashed on a curve near West School on state road 17.

The East Laporte Street Footbridge, Heminger Travel Lodge, Marshall County Courthouse, Plymouth Downtown Historic District, Plymouth Northside Historic District, Plymouth Southside Historic District, and Plymouth Fire Station are listed on the National Register of Historic Places.

Economy 
As the center of commerce for Marshall County, Plymouth provides a large percentage of jobs in the manufacturing, retail, and service sectors. Major manufacturing employers include Hoosier Racing Tire, Zentis, Oasis Lifestyle, Pregis Innovative Packaging, Pretzels Inc. and the Maax Corporation. Eight U.S. manufacturing headquarters are located in Plymouth: Oasis Lifestyle, American Containers, Inc., Arrow Services, Inc., Indiana Tool & Manufacturing, Co. Inc (ITAMCO) U.S. Granules Corp., Wiers Manufacturing, Inc. and Zentis North America, LLC.

Parks and recreation

Centennial Park
Plymouth is home to nine parks. Centennial Park is the largest park in Plymouth. It is equipped with a swimming pool, lighted baseball and softball diamonds, lighted basketball courts, lighted tennis courts, sand volleyball courts, shuffleboard, horseshoes, a skate park, and multiple playgrounds. The large wooden castle playground was built in 1993. Another smaller, metal playground with swings and a climbing wall is a part of Centennial Park as well. Centennial Park also includes a dog park and a  Greenway Trail that connects several parks.

Blueberry Festival
Each year over Labor Day weekend, Centennial Park is host to the Marshall County Blueberry Festival. The Blueberry Festival is Indiana's 3rd largest festival by attendance and has been named a "Top 100 Event" in North America by the American Bus Association three times. Over 300 craft vendors and 100 food vendors from all across the United States showcase their goods. The festival also includes the Hoosier Old Wheels Antique Car Show, the Blueberry Stomp 5K/15K run, Bicycle Cruise, hot air balloon launches, a parade, and fireworks display. There are several sporting events, and three stages with free entertainment for festival goers. For a small fee, festival goers can play carnival games and ride carnival rides.

River Park Square
River Park Square is located downtown and is the newest park in the city, opening in 2014. River Park Square consists of a stage, tiered seating, a splash pad, and a concession and bathroom building. It is home to Plymouth's Saturday Farmer's Market, the Yellow River Festival, the Latino Festival, and Mayor's Month of Music on Friday's in August. The Farmer's Market takes place every Saturday morning from May to October.

Packard's Woods
Packard's Wood Park also has athletic facilities and offers an all-inclusive play center called Freedom Park. Magnetic Park contains a playground, a fishing pond, and a gazebo with a fountain as well as the Conservation Clubhouse, which is able to be rented out for events.

Points of interest
The town has a lending library, the Plymouth Public Library. The library, located on North Center Street, has worked hard to be useful for all different groups and individuals. According to the Plymouth Public Library website, “The Library's broad purpose, based upon provisions in the Indiana Code, is fulfilling ‘the educational informational, and recreational interests and needs of the public.'"

Notable people

Military and politics 

Henry N. Couden enlisted in the 6th Regiment, Ohio Volunteer Infantry as a rank of corporal when the American Civil War broke out in 1861. Couden lost his sight in 1863 due to being wounded in the Battle of Beaver Dam Lake. He also served as the 54th Chaplain of the United States House of Representatives from 1895 to 1921 and was the second blind, religious leader to hold this position.
Florence Riddick Boys (1873-1963), journalist, suffragist, and state official, lived in Plymouth from 1904 to 1963.

Entertainers 

 Raymond Walburn was born in Plymouth but moved to Oakland, California to pursue an acting career. He acted in films from 1916 to 1955.
 Nick and Will Kubley of Plymouth were involved in Kidz Bop. Kidz Bop makes kid-friendly versions of popular songs. Afterwards they would go on to form Passafire, a group that makes nursery rhyme versions of reggae songs.

Athletes and Coaches 

 Noble Kizer played football at the University of Notre Dame under coach Knute Rockne from 1922 to 1924. Stood as Purdue University's head football coach from 1930 to 1936. Kizer was inducted into the Indiana Football Hall of Fame in 1977.
 Steve Yoder was born in Plymouth and graduated from Plymouth High School in 1958. Yoder went on the Illinois Wesleyan University where he pursued basketball and baseball. He began his coaching career prior to receiving his master's degree by coaching a junior high basketball team in Glen Ellyn, Illinois. Yoder became Plymouth High School's head basketball coach in 1967 and was named District One Coach of the Year after his final year at Plymouth in 1973. In 1975, after serving as Furman University's assistant coach, he returned to Indiana where he became Penn High School head coach. However, he became Ball State University's assistant coach the year after, and their head coach the next year. Yoder held the head coaching position at Ball State University from 1977 to 1982. He stood as head coach at the University of Wisconsin–Madison for the next ten years before he went to work for the Indiana Pacers and New York Knicks as a scout.
 Scott Skiles graduated from Plymouth High School in 1982 then went on to play basketball for and graduate from Michigan State University in 1986. He has played for Milwaukee Bucks, Indiana Pacers, Orlando Magic, Washington Bullets, Philadelphia 76ers, and PAOK Thessaloniki (Greek basketball league). He coached for the Phoenix Suns, Chicago Bulls, Milwaukee Bucks, and Orlando Magic. His playing career lasted from 1986 to 1997; his coaching career began in 1997. On December 30, 1990 Skiles broke the single-game assist record while playing for the Orlando Magic. He had 30 assists vs. the Denver Nuggets and the record stands to this day.
 Morgan Uceny born in Plymouth graduated from Cornell University in 2007 as a four-time All-American. Won the National Title for the 1500m which qualified her for the 2012 Olympics in London.

References

External links
 City of Plymouth
 Plymouth, Indiana Chamber of Commerce

Cities in Indiana
Cities in Marshall County, Indiana
Micropolitan areas of Indiana
County seats in Indiana
Montgomery Ward
Sundown towns in Indiana